Circus Girl is a 1937 American action film directed by John H. Auer and written by Adele Buffington and Bradford Ropes. The film stars June Travis, Robert Livingston, Donald Cook, Betty Compson, Charles Murray and Lucille Osborne. The film was March 1, 1937, by Republic Pictures.

Plot
Trapeze artists Bob McAvoy and Charles Jerome have a successful act. Both develop a romantic interest in Kay Rogers, who also wants to become a circus performer.

Bob is furious when Charlie and Kay are secretly married, knowing that Charlie is also carrying on with Carlotta, the lion tamer. After a fight between the men, Charlie is injured in a fall and believes Bob dropped him on purpose.

Plotting his revenge, Charlie pretends to become manager of a new act featuring Bob with Kay, but behind the scenes sabotages the rig. Working without a net, Bob is about to fall into a den of lions, but when Kay tries to save him, Charlie's conscience gets the better of him. He rescues Bob, but plummets to his own demise.

Cast
June Travis as Kay Rogers
Robert Livingston as Bob McAvoy
Donald Cook as Charles Jerome
Betty Compson as Carlotta
Charles Murray as Slippery
Lucille Osborne* as Gloria
Donald Kerr as Gabby
Emma Dunn as Molly
John Wray as Roebling
John Holland as Reporter
Kathryn Sheldon as Nurse

References

External links
 

1937 films
1930s action films
American black-and-white films
American action films
Circus films
1930s English-language films
Films directed by John H. Auer
Republic Pictures films
Films produced by Nat Levine
Films scored by Karl Hajos
1930s American films